Domingo de Valencia (1647 – 21 Jun 1719) was a Roman Catholic prelate who was appointed as Bishop of Nueva Caceres (1718).

Biography
Domingo de Valencia was born in Manila in 1647. On 10 Jan 1718, he was appointed during the papacy of Pope Clement XI as Bishop of Nueva Caceres. He died before he was consecrated on 21 Jun 1719. He assisted in the episcopal consecration of Miguel Bayot, Bishop of Cebú (1699).

References

External links and additional sources
 (for Chronology of Bishops) 
 (for Chronology of Bishops) 

18th-century Roman Catholic bishops in the Philippines
Bishops appointed by Pope Clement XI
1647 births
1719 deaths
Clergy from Manila
People from Naga, Camarines Sur
Roman Catholic bishops of Cáceres